Septicflesh (formerly known as Septic Flesh) are a Greek death metal band from Athens, founded in 1990.

History 

Septicflesh were formed in Athens in March 1990 by Sotiris Vayenas (guitar), Spiros Antoniou (bass and vocals), and Christos Antoniou (guitars). They released a debut EP, Temple of the Lost Race in December with Black Power Records, 1991. The band recorded their first full-length album, Mystic Places of Dawn, in April 1994 at the Storm studio with the co-production of Magus Wampyr Daoloth (who had been the keyboardist for Rotting Christ). released by Holy Records. They started working on a new album for 1995 and named it Esoptron. It was produced by Septic Flesh and George Zacharopoulos, recorded and mixed at Storm Studios in March - April 1995, mastered by Sonic Contact (France), and released by Holy Records

Session vocalist Natalie Rassoulis joined for The Ophidian Wheel (1997) and again for A Fallen Temple (1998).

The group split up in October 2003, and after the breakup, its members moved on to different or existing projects:
Christos Antoniou continued involvement with Chaostar, which he formed in 1998, and Katsionis played guitar for Nightfall and keyboards for Firewind.
TheDevilWorx formed a year after Septic Flesh's disbanding, and featured some members
from Septic Flesh's original line-up. In March 2007, guitarist Sotiris Vayenas revealed his plans for a new solo project called Aenaos.

On February 19, 2007, Septic Flesh announced a reunion for Greece's Metal Healing Festival featuring Orphaned Land, Rage and Aborted, set to take place July 20–22.

On April 3, 2007, Blabbermouth.net reported the band reunited for a seventh full-length CD, for French record label Season of Mist. According to guitarist and composer Christos Antoniou, the release would feature a full orchestra and a choir, totalling 80 musicians and 32 singers. Septic Flesh finalized the new album, Communion, in Studio Fredman in Sweden; it was released in April 2008. By this time the band had changed its name from Septic Flesh to Septicflesh. According to guitarist Christos it looks better and states a new phase in the band.

On September 10, 2009, the band announced that they had begun work on a new studio album, tentatively planned for release in the beginning of 2011.

On December 17, 2010, the band released the first single, "The Vampire From Nazareth", and announced that the new album will be shipped on April 28 in the UK, and April 29 in the United States.

On February 12, 2014, the band released details about Titan. The album was released in June 2014. On December 15, 2014, it was announced that Kerim "Krimh" Lechner had joined Septicflesh as their new drummer, following the recent departure of their former longtime drummer, Fotis Benardo (a.k.a. Fotis Gianakopoulos).

In June 2016 interview it was declared that, since early 2016, Septicflesh had been working on their tenth studio album, scheduled for release toward spring 2017. In early June 2017, band members claimed that Septicflesh's tenth album, titled Codex Omega, is officially due to release on September 1, 2017. Like the previous album, Titan, Codex Omega was released through Prosthetic Records.

On August 29, 2018, it was announced that the band had signed to Nuclear Blast Records.

In February 2019, Septicflesh performed their first live performance featuring a full orchestra and choir, in a sold-out performance at the Teatro Metropólitan in Mexico City, Mexico.  The show was recorded and was released through Season of Mist in July 2020 as the band's first official live album, titled Infernus Sinfonica MMXIX, in audio and video format.

In 2020, the band announced the upcoming release of a new studio album. The album, entitled "Modern Primitive" was released in May of 2022.

Personnel

Current members
Spiros "Seth Siro Anton" Antoniou – unclean vocals, bass (1990–2003, 2007–present)
Sotiris Vayenas "Sotiris Anunnaki V." – rhythm guitar, clean vocals, keyboards, lyrics (1990–2003, 2007–present)
Christos Antoniou – lead guitar, orchestrations, samples (1990–2003, 2007–present)
Kerim "Krimh" Lechner – drums (2014–present)
Dinos "Psychon" Prassas – rhythm guitar (2018–present; touring 2008–2018)

Former members
Dimitris Valasopoulos – drums (1990–1991)
Akis "Lethe" Kapranos – drums (1999–2003)
Mohammad Mirboland – drums (1996–1998)
George "Magus Wampyr Daoloth" Zaharopoulos – keyboards (2001–2003)
Fotis Gianakopoulos – drums (2003, 2007–2014)

Session musicians
Kostas Savvidis – drums (1993–1997)
Natalie Rassoulis – vocals (1997–1998)
Bob Katsionis – keyboards (2003)

Timeline

Discography

Studio albums

EPs
Temple of the Lost Race (EP, 1991)
The Eldest Cosmonaut (EP, 1998)

Singles
 "The Vampire from Nazareth" (2010)
"Order of Dracul" (2014)

Live albums 

 Live in Toulouse (June 20, 2014, Season of Mist, DL/Bonus CD)
 Infernus Sinfonica MMXIX (July 31, 2020, Season of Mist, CD/LP/DL & DVD/Blu-Ray)

Music videos

References

External links
 
 
 Sotiris Vayenas, Interview: "We Always Enjoyed Experimenting" March 10, 2013
 Interview with Sotiris, 1995

1990 establishments in Greece
Greek death metal musical groups
Greek heavy metal musical groups
Symphonic metal musical groups
Musical groups established in 1990
Musical groups disestablished in 2003
Musical groups reestablished in 2007
Greek melodic death metal musical groups
Musical quartets
Musical groups from Athens
Season of Mist artists
Nuclear Blast artists